"Danza Kuduro" (English: Dance Kuduro) is a Spanish/Portuguese song by Puerto Rican recording artist Don Omar featuring Portuguese–French singer Lucenzo from Don Omar's collaborative album Meet the Orphans. The song is an adaptation of Lucenzo's "Vem Dançar Kuduro", a Portuguese/English song. "Danza Kuduro" was released as the lead single from the album on August 15, 2010, through Machete, VI. It became a hit in most Latin American countries, and eventually all over Europe. "Danza Kuduro" was number one on the Hot Latin Songs, giving Don Omar his second US Billboard Hot Latin Songs number-one hit and Lucenzo his first.  A remake of the song is also featured in the 2011 movie Fast Five as an ending song and is on the film's soundtrack album. "Danza Kuduro" ended up being the most successful song with a significant number of verses in European Portuguese of the 2010s. The track ranked 43 on Rolling Stone`s Greatest Latin Pop Songs.

Kuduro is a style of dancing, as well as a musical genre, from Angola. In spite of the name, "Danza Kuduro" - just like "Vem Dançar Kuduro" - can't be considered straight-up Kuduro. Brazilian rapper Daddy Kall and singer Latino released a Brazilian version of the song, "Dança Kuduro", of the song with amended Portuguese lyrics.

Background
The song, written and produced by Lucenzo, is mostly sung in Spanish by Don Omar, except for Lucenzo's lone verse in European Portuguese. The verse is taken from Lucenzo's previously released song "Vem Dançar Kuduro", featuring Big Ali.
Kuduro is a dance style practiced in the West African country of Angola. Originally designed to pay tribute towards the many disfigured and crippled people within the country due to the deadly civil war that ravaged the country and left landmines throughout the region. The dance is meant to not only pay tribute towards these handicapped individuals, but also incorporate their erratic and jerky movements into the flow of the moves. While Portugal once retained bloody control over the former colony the diasporic spread of the musically inspired dance craze has added to the feel of "world music" taking the concept of Kuduro from Brazil to Beijing.

Critical reception
Amar Toor from Aol Radio Blog said that the song "showcases one of reggaeton's brightest stars at his absolute best. [...] Don Omar's song is so infectious, it will likely get buried in your mind after just one listen -- and trust us, that's a very good thing".

Monica Herrera from Billboard said "The propulsive beat is laced with crowd-pleasing electric accordion runs, over which Don Omar sings and raps about a simple yet evergreen concept: dancing up a storm. The song wisely shifts him toward more tropical-leaning material-a move all too familiar in reggaetón's post-boom era-while letting him continue to explore new sounds and maintain his hold over Latin dancefloors around the world." Allison Stewart from The Washington Post said that the song "exemplifies what Omar and company do best: It's a sunny, up-tempo, utterly winning variation on Latin dance pop. 'Orphans' otherwise contains seemingly infinite variations on reggaeton, though there's nothing else as great as the standard genre track 'Hasta Abajo', which appears here in un-remixed form". At the Latin Grammy Awards of 2011, "Danza Kuduro" received a nomination for Best Urban Song. It won the Billboard Latin Music Award for Latin Rhythm Airplay Song of the Year in 2011 and 2012.

Commercial performance

The song debuted at number 48 on the Billboard Hot Latin Songs. One week later, the song debuted at number 34 on the Tropical Songs. The song has become Don Omar's second number-one hit on the Billboard Latin Songs, and also topped the Latin Rhythm Songs, Latin Tropical Songs. On the Venezuelan Airplay Chart from the Record Report, the song also reached the top of the Latin Chart, and peaked at number 2 on the main Top 100 Chart. Due to heavy airplay and strong sales in the US, on the issue of May 21, 2011 the song debuted at number 82 on the Billboard Hot 100 and number 93 on the Canadian Hot 100.  It has sold over a million digital copies in the US by October 2012.

According to Universal Records, the single became a worldwide hit, reaching No. 1 in Argentina, Ecuador, Venezuela, Italy, Netherlands, Spain, Romania, Austria, Switzerland, Germany, Sweden and on the US Hot Latin Songs chart, and making the top 5 in Serbia, Bosnia and Herzegovina, Colombia, Chile, Central America, Denmark, and Norway. The single has found greater success especially in Italy where it topped the charts for 10 straight weeks.

Music video
A music video was filmed on the Caribbean island of St. Martin, and was directed by music video director Vincent Egret, who has directed most of Lucenzo's recent videos. Production/Post supervised by Frederico Panetta and his team (4brostudio) Marc-Olivier Jean, Anderson Jean, Dullin Jean, Fayolle Jean Jr. did the post-production of the music video. After Title Short Song Taboo By Don Omar In this The video shows the singers boasting of all the wealth of a millionaire. It portrays Don Omar inviting Lucenzo to a boat ride, and picking him up in a BMW Z4. Also there are scenes of women dancing around the two artists on the beach. Before the video premiere, a preview of the video was released on July 30, 2010, through Omar's Facebook account.

The full music video was premiered on August 17, 2010, through Vevo. There were more than 1 million views within the first few days of its release, making "Danza Kuduro" the #3 Most Seen Video in the World. Since 2018 the music video for "Danza Kuduro" exceeded one billion views.

Charts

Weekly charts

Year-end charts

Decade-end charts

All time charts

Certifications

References

2010 singles
Don Omar songs
Machete Music singles
Number-one singles in Austria
Number-one singles in Venezuela
Number-one singles in Italy
Dutch Top 40 number-one singles
Number-one singles in Spain
Number-one singles in Romania
Number-one singles in Switzerland
Number-one singles in Germany
Number-one singles in Sweden
Record Report Top Latino number-one singles
Songs written by Don Omar
2010 songs
Songs written by Lucenzo